Pothunuru is a village in Denduluru mandal of Eluru district, Andhra Pradesh, India.

Demographics 

 Census of India, Pothunuru had a population of 7177. The total population constitute, 3619 males and 3558 females with a sex ratio of 993 females per 1000 males. 684 children are in the age group of 0–6 years, with sex ratio of 1024. The average literacy rate stands at 74.51%.

Eminent persons
 Kommareddi Suryanarayana - a parliamentarian was born here.

Parvathaneni Upendra, a parliamentarian and Ex Central minister was born here.

Maganti Varalaksmi Devi, Ex Member of Legislature Assembly was born here.

References

Villages in Eluru district